Grimsby Regional Airport  is a registered aerodrome located near Grimsby, Ontario, Canada.

References

Registered aerodromes in Ontario
Transport in the Regional Municipality of Niagara
Transport in Grimsby, Ontario

Grimsby, Ontario